Wang Zhongyu (century) was a Chinese painter during the Hongwu Era (1368–1398) of the Ming Dynasty. He was known for painting people. Little else is known of his life.

References

Citations

Bibliography

 Zhongguo gu dai shu hua jian ding zu (中国古代书画鑑定组). 2000. Zhongguo hui hua quan ji (中国绘画全集). Zhongguo mei shu fen lei quan ji. Beijing: Wen wu chu ban she. Volume 10.

Ming dynasty painters
Year of death unknown
Year of birth unknown